Josiah Collins may refer to:

 Josiah Collins (North Carolina politician) (1807–1826), North Carolina State Senator
 Josiah Collins (Washington fire chief) (1864–1949), Washington State Senator and Seattle Fire Commissioner